Stephen Frank Meilinger (December 12, 1930 – September 14, 2015) was an American football end who played professionally in the National Football League (NFL) for the Washington Redskins, the Green Bay Packers, and the Pittsburgh Steelers.  He played college football at the University of Kentucky and was drafted  in the first round of the 1954 NFL Draft.

Following his NFL career, Meilinger joined the United States Marshals Service.  During his Marshals Service career, he was one of the original agents for the United States Federal Witness Protection Program, and eventually was promoted to Chief Deputy for the Eastern District of Kentucky, where he served until his retirement. In 2014, he was inducted into the College Football Hall of Fame. He died in 2015 at the age of 84.

References

1930 births
2015 deaths
American football ends
Green Bay Packers players
Kentucky Wildcats football players
Pittsburgh Steelers players
Washington Redskins players
United States Marshals
College Football Hall of Fame inductees
Sportspeople from Bethlehem, Pennsylvania
Players of American football from Pennsylvania